The 1929 Wightman Cup was the seventh edition of the annual women's team tennis competition between the United States and Great Britain. It was held on August 8 and 9, 1929 at the West Side Tennis Club in Forest Hills, Queens in New York City,  NY in the United States. The U.S. team regained the cup.

See also
 1929 Davis Cup

References

1929
1929 in tennis
1929 in American tennis
1929 in British sport
1929 in women's tennis